John Curtis (born 2 September 1954 in Poulton-le-Fylde, Lancashire) is an English former professional footballer. He played as a defender.

References

1954 births
People from Poulton-le-Fylde
English footballers
Blackpool F.C. players
Blackburn Rovers F.C. players
Wigan Athletic F.C. players
Morecambe F.C. players
Living people
Association football defenders